James Radcliffe (November 18, 1936 – July 27, 1973) was an American soul singer, composer, arranger, conductor and record producer.

Biography
James Radcliffe was born in New York City. He released such singles as "My Ship is Coming In", a song composed by his writing partner Joey Brooks (later of "You Light Up My Life" fame), was later covered by The Walker Brothers as a pop music hit, and also wrote several songs featured in the children's TV show The Banana Splits. He will be probably best remembered for his recording of "Long After Tonight Is All Over" (written by Burt Bacharach and Hal David) which became famous as one of the "3 before 8" songs that was played at the Wigan Casino all-nighters, the Northern soul venue. The song was a minor hit in the UK Singles Chart in 1965, reaching #40. The popularity of "Long After Tonight Is All Over" led to a promotional tour in support of the record, wherein Radcliffe was featured in the British music press (Record Mirror, NME) and appeared on numerous radio and televisions shows including "Ready, Steady, Go!" with The Rolling Stones "Time Is On My Side", The Kinks "Tired Of Waiting For You", The Righteous Brothers "You've Lost That Lovin' Feelin'" Del Shannon "Keep Searching" (January 15, 1965) and Thank Your Lucky Stars; the ABC Lucky Stars Special Presents Cilla Black with Cilla Black, The Riot Squad, The Hollies, The Swinging Blue Jeans, Del Shannon and Paul Anka (January 23, 1965); and The Eamonn Andrews Show.

Radcliffe did not live long enough to see this recording achieve cult status. Long plagued by a weight problem, he had a kidney removed in 1973 and developed further complications with his remaining one. He died in hospital the same year on July 27 (two months before Wigan Casino opened its doors on September 23), leaving his wife, Judy, and two sons, Christopher and William.

Career as vocalist
During his tenure as one of New York City's most successful session vocalists, Radcliffe's voice was the first to sing future hit songs like "This Diamond Ring" (Al Kooper, Bobby Brass, Irwin Levine) and "Pretty Flamingo" (Mark Barkan), and contribute to the session releases by The Definitive Rock Chorale's "Variations on a Theme Called Hanky Panky" produced by Ellie Greenwich and Mike Rashkow.

Radcliffe's vocal abilities earned him the distinction of being referred to as "The Soul of The Brill Building Sound". Burt Bacharach and Hal David had him record songs for Gene Pitney, as would Ellie Greenwich and Tony Powers. Gloria Shayne enlisted his help to get Burl Ives and Arthur Prysock covers. Jerry Leiber and Mike Stoller, Scott English and Claus Ogerman were among his clients.

To supplement his income, he hired out as a backing vocalist, and recorded with Doris Troy, Dee Dee Warwick, Cissy Houston, Melba Moore, Toni Wine, Jean Thomas and Barbara Jean English doing sessions for groups such as The Drifters. Radcliffe, Dionne Warwick, and Dee Dee Warwick provided backing vocals on The Drifters "Sweets for My Sweet" recording, (1961).

Singer-songwriter Sherman Edwards recorded the original vocal demos of his songs for the planned musical "1776", but by late 1968 Edwards had also enlisted Jimmy Radcliffe ("Mama Look Sharp", "Is Anybody There"), Bernie Knee ("Mama Look Sharp", "Is Anybody There"), Ann Gilbert ("He Plays The Violin", "Yours, Yours, Yours") to record stylized demo versions that might also impact the pop charts. "1776" went on to become a 1969 Tony Award-winning Broadway show that inspired a 1972 feature film.

Another instance of Jimmy Radcliffe's involvement with Broadway bound musicals were his vocal demos of the Bob James and Jack O'Brien songs "Take My Hand" and "Stars Of Glory" for the now notorious 1972 theatrical production of The Selling of the President, based upon the best-selling book by author Joe McGinniss.

In August 1963, while preparing to work with the record producer, Bert Berns, on his third release on Musicor Records, Radcliffe attended a session at Chess Studios, produced by Berns, where three of his co-compositions were being recorded by Tammy Montgomery: "This Time Tomorrow", "I Can't Hold It In Any More" and "I've Got Nothing To Say But Goodbye". "This Time Tomorrow" would be issued as the B-side of Montgomery's Chess/Checker single, "If I Would Marry You." Radcliffe recorded with Montgomery a duet version of "If I Would Marry You," more than three years before her name change to Tammi Terrell and pairing with Marvin Gaye at Motown. The unreleased duet, and the other two unreleased songs from the sessions, were released on Come on And See Me, a double collection of Terrell's recordings.

One Bert Berns, Carl Spencer and Jimmy Radcliffe collaboration that did make the pop charts in 1963 was the song "My Block", recorded by The Chiffons. "She's Got Everything" recorded by The Essex, and produced by Henry Glover, as a follow-up to their million-seller "Easier Said Than Done" also charted at #56 and inspired recordings by singers Maxine Brown, Sugar Pie DeSanto and Barbara George.

Career as composer and producer
In 1964, after a meeting with Martin Luther King Jr., in a Harlem supper club, Radcliffe was inspired and composed his ballad of freedom and equality "Stand Up". Unreleased at the time, until the 2008 issue Where There Smoke There's Fire, the track featured Radcliffe playing the vibes. Radcliffe was self-taught on the guitar, piano, bass, vibes and drums, preferring to write using his Goya acoustic guitar because of its portability.

Beginning in 1965, Radcliffe was the first African-American performing artist to write, produce and sing commercial jingles for the advertising industry. By the time of his death om 1973, he had worked on over two hundred television and radio commercials.

Steve Karmen remembered Radcliffe in the advertising industry: "Typically, Jim would be called to come to the studio at a designated time, in most cases not even being told the name of the product he was to sing about, then be given about five minutes to learn a song that he had never seen before that moment, and was then expected to deliver the 'soul' version of the commercial".

A few of Radcliffe's best known commercials are the 1969–70 Pontiac, "breakaway in a wide tracking Pontiac", the 30-second commercial was expanded for general release to try to capitalize on its popularity and was released as "Breakaway" by the Steve Karmen Big Band featuring Jimmy Radcliffe; the soul version of McDonald's  (1971); and the Clio Award-winning "Polaroid Gives It To You Now" (1971). 
The summer of 2011 has seen the rise of two campaigns: the first, to make the Radcliffe-Diamond song "You're The Salt Of The Earth Pal" the advertising "sound brand identity" theme for Salt Lake City's Tourism Bureau in Utah and the second, to have Jimmy's "I'm Gonna Find a Cave" song accepted as the international "Man caves" Anthem.

Radcliffe's recordings have appeared in films such as Radley Metzger's 1967's Carmen Baby, Allen Funt's What Do You Say to a Naked Lady? (1970), Gerald Potterton's Tiki Tiki (1971) wherein he was backed by Cissy Houston, Whitney Houston's mother on a gospel recording.  "Eve's Bayou" (1997), The Tenants starring Snoop Dogg and Dylan McDermott (2005), the 2006 romantic drama Something New starring Sanaa Lathan and Simon Baker and 2010's Soulboy a film about Northern soul.
Jimmy's recording of "Climb Ev'ry Mountain" was showcased on the premiere episode of "Hard Knocks In Season - The Indianapolis Colts" on November 17, 2021. It would be the longest use of a song in the sixteen season history of the Emmy winning series.

A part of Radcliffe's career often overlooked was his work as a songwriter, record producer and live performing artist. During his 14 years as a Brill Building, Tin Pan Alley songwriter, his songs were recorded by numerous recording artists in varying styles of music. In the early 1960s, Radcliffe was recognized for his 'message songs' about growing, striving and surviving the realities of living in Harlem. The poignant evocative storytelling of songs like "Three Rooms With Running Water", "My Block", "Deep in the Heart of Harlem" and "Stand Up" spoke about personal and social issues. By the later 1960s his live performances, in Greenwich Village, Amiri Baraka's Sister Kimako Baraka's Club CASBAH, and guest appearances on television including like "Inside Bedford Stuyvesant" with such friends as Richie Havens and poet Saundra Sharp, included protest sonsuch as like  and "Insults" dealing with institutionalized social injustice and racism combined with songs about Love.

Aretha Franklin's first credit as a record producer was with Radcliffe on "Black Pride" the theme to Jesse Jackson's (Southern Christian Leadership Conference) S.C.L.C. Black Expo '71. This history was largely overshadowed by the controversy over the suspension of Jesse Jackson by The S.C.L.C. director Ralph Abernathy over financial irregularities associated with the EXPO and Jackson's public resignation from S.C.L.C.'s Operation Breadbasket and the formation of his own Operation PUSH (People United to Save Humanity) in December 1971.

Selected writing credits
 The Andrews Sisters, "All The Colors of the Rainbow", Great Performers LP Dot Records-#25807, 1967
 Ray Charles, "Show Me The Sunshine", Love Country Style LP ABC-#707, 1970
 Robert Goulet, "If There's A Way", Columbia single #44100, 1967
 Johnny Mathis, Sings The Music of Bacharach & Kaempfert LP 1970 Columbia-#G-30350
 Aretha Franklin, "Pullin'", Spirit In The Dark LP Atlantic-#SD8265, 1970
 Carolyn Franklin, "Right On", Chain Reaction LP RCA Records-#LSP-4317, 1970
 Etta James, Argo Single#5437 was the B-side to "Pushover", 1963
 Lou Rawls, "Something Stirring In My Soul", Carryin' On LP Capitol Records-#ST2632, 1966
 Eric Burdon & The Animals, "It's Been A Long Time Comin'", Eric Is Here LP 1967 MGM
 Clyde McPhatter, "Deep In The Heart Of Harlem", "Three Rooms With Running Water", "My Block", "A Suburban Town", Coney Island Mercury LP-#20902 & SR-60902, 1964
 Jackie Wilson, "Soulville" Higher And Higher LP Brunswick Records-#BL754130, 1967 "The Fairest Of Them All" Brunswick single#55300, 1966
 Matt Monro, "Fourth Blue Monday", Capitol single#P-2058, 1967
 The Chiffons, "My Block", #67 (as The Four Pennies) on Rust Single#5071, 1963
 Patti Page, "Pretty Boy Lonely", #98 Columbia single#4-42671, 1963
 Marlena Shaw, "Nothing But Tears", Out of a Different Bag LP Cadet Records-#LPS-803, 1967
 Clara Ward, "If You Wanna Change The World", "Soul And Inspiration" LP Capitol #ST-126 Prod. David Axelrod, Arr. & Cond. H.B. Barnum, 1969
 The Clovers, "Sweet Side of a Soulful Woman" Josie Single#997, 1968
 Connie Francis, 
 Esther Phillips, Atlantic single#2570, 1966
 Jimmy Witherspoon, HUHN! LP 1970 Bluesway Records-#BLS-6040
 Johnny Maestro, Buddah single #201, 1970
 Nancy Wilson, "I'm Your Special Fool", Nancy LP Capitol Records-#ST-148, 1969
 The Essex, "She's Got Everything", #58 Roulett single#4530 1963
 Bert Kaempfert & His Orchestra, "But Not Today", A Man Could Get Killed, Decca DL-74750 (1966) and Strangers in the Night, Decca DL-74795 (1966)
 Chet Baker, "But Not Today", Mariachi Brass – Double Shout World Pacific-#1852, 1967
 Johnny Nash, "How Do I Say I Love You", Studio Time LP ABC Records-#ABCS-383, 1961
 Tammy Montgomery (later Tammi Terrell), "This Time Tomorrow" Checker single#1072, 1964
 The Hourglass (aka The Allman Bros), "Nothing But Tears", The Hour Glass LP Liberty Records-#56002, 1967
 The Banana Splits, "Adam Had'em", "I'm Gonna Find a Cave" "Don' Go Away Go-Go Girl" "The Show Must Go On", "Soul", We're The Banana Splits LP Decca DL-75075, 1968
 The Harlem Globetrotters (cartoon television series)
 The Fourmost, "My Block", First And Foremost LP Parlophone PMC 1259, Produced by George Martin, 1965
 Tom Jones, "It's Been A Long Time Comin'", A-Tom-Ic Jones LP Decca Records-#SKL-4743, 1966
 Helen Shapiro, "Forget About The Bad Things", Columbia single#DB7810, 1966
 Cliff Bennett & The Rebel Rousers, "Three Rooms With Running Water", Parolophone single#R5259 (UK) Amy single#930 (US), 1965
 Gene Pitney, "Lyda Sue, Wha'dya Do", Meets The Fair Ladies of Folkland LP Musicor-#MM2007, 1964
 Billy Lee Riley, "I'm Gonna Find A Cave", Crescendo single#371, 1966
 Bobby Lewis, "Intermission", Beltone single#B2035, 1963
 Adam Wade, "It's Been A Long Time Comin'" Epic single#5-9771, 1965 and "A Man Alone" Epic single#5-10112,
 Gloria Lynne, "Speaking of Happiness", "Love Child" and "Livin' The Life of Love"
 Lou Monte, "All for the Kids", RCA single#47-9405, 1967
 Vaughn Meader, "The Elephant Song", MGM single#K-13169, 1963
 Arthur Prysock, "Don't You Ever Feel Sorry", In A Mood LP 1966 Old Town Records-#2010
 P. J. Proby, "I Love Therefore I Am", Liberty Records EP-#LEP2229, 1965
 Julie London, "Treat Me Good", With Body And Soul LP 1967 Liberty Records-#3514
 Garnet Mimms & The Enchanters, "The Truth Hurts (But Not As Much as You Lies)", Cry Baby And 11 Other Hits LP United Artists-#UAL3305, 1963 and Veep single#1252, 1967
 Miki Dallon, "I'm Gonna Find A Cave", Strike single#306 (Spain) Picture Sleeve RCA single#3-10163, 1966
 The Sorrows, "I'm Gonna Find A Cave", Take A Heart CD, 2000
 Gina Sicilia "Try Me", Allow Me To Confess CD Swing Nation, 2007
 Girl Trouble, "Gonna Find A Cave", Sub Pop 200, 1988
 Mr. T Experience, "Don't Go Away Go-Go Girl", Big Black Bugs Bleed Blue Blood CD
 Kristina Train, "If You Want Me", Split Milk CD 2009 Blue Note
 Rattlin Bone "Speaking Of Happiness" (2010)
 

As a record producer Radcliffe produced the original demo of the song "It's My Party". While acting as A&R director of Musicor Records he signed The Intruders who released the single "But You Belong To Me" b/w "Jack Be Nimble" and pop group The Critters, producing the latter's first release "Georgianna" b/w "I'm Gonna Give" in 1964 before they moved over to Kapp Records. Also in 1964, Radcliffe produced a record for the soul group The Relatives that featured the song "Hadn't Been For Baby", which he co-wrote with Billy Edd Wheeler. Radcliffe was also label-mate Gene Pitney's recording manager. Having met years earlier, before either had signed to Aaron Schroeder's publishing company, Radcliffe helped manage which songs Pitney would record, and directed his recording sessions.

Radcliffe co-produced, with John Hammond, Pat Lundy's album Soul Aint Nothin' But The Blues (1967) on Columbia Records and much of the material used on Carolyn Franklin, first three albums for RCA Records. Radcliffe and Aretha Franklin co-produced the theme , for the Jesse Jackson organized S.C.L.C. Black Expo in New York City in 1971.

Discography

Contemporary releases
Musicor Records
 "Twist Calypso" (Phil Stern, Jimmy Radcliffe) / "Don't Look My Way" (Phil Stern, Jimmy Radcliffe) Single# MU-1016, Produced by Aaron Schroeder and Wally Gold, 1962
 "(There Goes) The Forgotten Man" (Hal David, Burt Bacharach) / "An Awful Lot of Cryin'" (Buddy Kaye, Phil Springer) Single# MU1024, Side 'A' Produced by Aaron Schroeder and Wally Gold, arranged & conducted by Burt Bacharach, Side 'B' Produced by Bert Berns. 1962
 "Through a Long and Sleepless Night" (Mack Gordan, Alfred Newman) / "Moment of Weakness" (Oramay Diamond, Jimmy Radcliffe) Single# MU-1033, Produced by Bert Berns. 1963
 "Long After Tonight Is All Over" (Hal David, Burt Bacharach) / "What I Want I Can Never Have" (Gloria Shayne) Single# MU1042, Produced by Bert Berns. Charted #40 UK Singles Chart (Issued on Stateside Records #374)

Aurora Records
 "My Ship Is Comin' In" (Joey Brooks) / "Goin' Where The Lovin' Is" (Joey Brooks, Aaron Schroeder) Single# 154, Produced by Joey Brooks for Past, Present & Future Productions. 1965

Shout Records
 "Lucky Old Sun" (Haven Gillespie, Beasley Smith) / "So Deep" (Bob Brass, Joey Brooks) Single#202, Produced by Buddy Scott, Jimmy Radcliffe and Wally Gold for Past, Present & Future Productions. Arranged & conducted by Bert Decoteaux. 1966

United Artists
The Steve Karmen Big Band featuring Jimmy Radcliffe
 "Breakaway" (Steve Karmen) / "Breakaway" Part 2 (Steve Karmen) Single# 50451 Produced & arranged by Steve Karmen. 1968

RCA Records
 "Funky Bottom Congregation" (Thommy Kaye) / "Lay A Little Lovin' On Me" (Buddy Scott, Jimmy Radcliffe) Single# 74-0138, Produced, arranged and conducted by Jimmy Radcliffe for Super Baby Cakes Productions. 1969

Selected discography of uncredited releases
Tollie Records
 The B.R.A.T.T.S. (The Brotherhood for the R-establishment of American Top Ten Supremacy)
 (Arthur Korb) / "Jealous Kind of Woman" (Carl Spencer) Single#9024, Produced by Wally Gold for Past, Present And Future Productions, Arranged & conducted by Bob Halley. Vocals: Carl Spencer & Jimmy Radcliffe 1964

Musicor Records
 Joey Brooks
"Cry, Cry, Cry" (Joey Brooks, Jimmy Radcliffe) / "A Girl Wants To Believe" (Joey Brooks, Jimmy Radcliffe) Single #MU1037, Produced by Brooks/Radcliffe, arranged & conducted by Garry Sherman. Lead Vocals: Joey Brooks, Backing Vocals: Jimmy Radcliffe. 1964

Fontana Records (UK)
 The Mixture
"One By One" (Joey Brooks, Jimmy Radcliffe) / "Monkey Jazz" (Joey Brooks, Jimmy Radcliffe) Single#TF-640, Produced and arranged by Jimmy Radcliffe & Joey Brooks for Past, Present and Future Productions. Lead Vocals & Scat by Jimmy Radcliffe, Backing Vocals by Joey Brooks 1965

Decca Records (UK)
 Joey Brooks And The Baroque Folk
"I Ain't Blaming You" (Joey Brooks, Al Stillman) /  (Joey Brooks, Wally Gold, Aaron Schroeder)
Single # F12328, Produced and arranged by Joey Brooks, Lead Vocal: Joey Brooks, Backing Vocal & Acoustic Guitar: Jimmy Radcliffe. January 1966.

Rust Records
 Carl Spencer
"Cover Girl" (Carl Spencer, Al Cleveland) / "Progress" (Bob Halley, Carl Spencer) Single#5104, Produced and arranged by Bob Halley for Alice in Wonderland Productions. Side 'B' = Lead Vocal: Carl Spencer, Backing Vocal: Jimmy Radcliffe. 1966

Parrot Records
 The Daily News
"I'm In The Mood" (S. Barnes, J.J. Jackson) / "The Groove" (Holt, Holt, Ealey, Paris) Single#327, Produced by Ellie Greenwich and Mike Rashkow for Pineywood Productions Inc., Horns arranged by Meco Monardo. Side 'A'= Lead Vocal: Frankie Paris, Counter Lead Vocal: Jimmy Radcliffe. 1968

Philips Records
 The Definitive Rock Chorale
"Variations On A Theme Called Hanky Panky" (Ellie Greenwich, Jeff Barry) / "Picture Postcard World" (Paul Levinson) Single#40529, Produced by Mike Rashkow and Ellie Greenwich for Pineywood Productions Inc. Side 'A' arranged by Sammy Lowe, Side 'B' arranged By Paul Lewshen. Lead & Backing Vocals: Johnny Cymbal, Michael Rashkow Ellie Greenwich, Ron Dante, Toni Wine, Lesley Miller, Billy Carr, Tommy West (Picardo), Terry Cashman, Gene Pistilli, Jimmy Radcliffe. 1968

Kirshner Records
 The Globetrotters
"Duke of Earl" (Gene Chandler, Earl Edwards, Bernice Williams) / "Everybody's Got Hot Pants (Neil Sedaka, Howard Greenfield) Single#63-5012, Produced by Jimmy Radcliffe & Wally Gold, arranged By Jimmy Radcliffe. Lead & Backing Vocals: Jimmy Radcliffe. Music Supervisor: Don Kirshner 1971

"Everybody Needs Love" (Phil Stern, Jimmy Radcliffe) / "ESP" (Neil Sedaka, Howard Greenfield) Single#63-5016, Side 'A' Produced by Jimmy Radcliffe & Wally Gold, arranged by Jimmy Radcliffe. Lead & Backing Vocal: Jimmy Radcliffe. Side 'B' Produced by Jeff Barry (Unknown Non-Radcliffe Vocal). Music Supervisor: Don Kirshner 1971

Selected discography of recent releases
 "Eve's Bayou – The Collection" 1997 Film Soundtrack featuring: Erykah Badu, Ray Charles, Etta James, Louis Armstrong & Velma Middleton, Bobby "Blue" Bland, Johnny Ace, Sugar Boy Crawford, Geno Delafose, Jimmy Radcliffe and a score by Terence Blanchard.
  "Something New" (2006) Film Soundtrack CD featuring: Rosey, Me'shell Ndege'Ocello, Mobb Deep, Van Hunt, R. Luna and the Co-Stars, Wayne Wonder & Demolition, Morello, Sheila Skipworth, Jimmy Radcliffe and a score by Wendy Melvoin & Lisa Coleman.
 Where There's Smoke There's Fire" (2008) a 16 track CD encompassing alternate takes some of Radcliffe's best known work, demos with 12 previously unreleased recordings.
 "Super Baby Cakes – Jimmy Radcliffe & Friends" (2009) CD Each selection of this collection was either written, produced, arranged or performed by the prolific behind the scenes New York City super talent Jimmy Radcliffe. Included are recordings from Pat Lundy, Irene Reid, Barbara Jean English, The Relatives, The Silent Glo, The Money Clips, and Diamond Neval.
 Tammi Terrell "Come On And See Me – The Complete Solo Collection" (2010) 2 CD, 50 Track release featuring all of Tammi's solo recordings before and after she signed to Motown. This collection includes the previously unreleased Tammy Montgomery & Jimmy Radcliffe Duet on "If I Would Marry You".

Bibliography
 Pruter, Robert, editor (1993). Blackwell Guide to Soul Recordings. Oxford: Basil Blackwell Ltd.

References

Other sources
 There's That Beat Magazine, Issue # 8, July 2008
 Billboard Magazine: March 24, 1962
 Billboard, September 22, 1962,  (There Goes) The Forgotten Man – Review
 Billboard, August 3, 1963
 Billboard, November 28, 1964 (Long After Tonight Is All Over)
 Billboard, January 16, 1965  (Gene Pitney's Recording Manager)
 Billboard, July 31, 1965 ("My Ship Is Comin'" In Review) 
 Billboard, September 2, 1967  "Liscris Productions"
 Billboard, October 21, 1967 ("Soul Ain't Nothing But The Blues" Single Review)
 Jet Magazine, February 11, 1971 (Performing at Kimako Baraka's Club CASBAH)
 Billboard, May 8, 1971  (Globetrotters "Duke Of EarL")
 Billboard, June 30, 1973 (Working With Carolyn Franklin)

External links
 Myspace Page
 Facebook Page
 Biography and Discography
 List Of Songs And Artist
 Recent Releases Reviewed / Songwriting Discography
 "The Work of Claus Ogerman" – a comprehensive site, dedicated to Ogerman

1936 births
1973 deaths
American soul singers
Record producers from New York (state)
Songwriters from New York (state)
Place of death missing
Northern soul musicians
20th-century American singers
20th-century American businesspeople
20th-century American male singers
American male songwriters